Rowley railway station served the hamlet of Rowley and the village of Castleside in County Durham, England from 1845 to 1966 on the Derwent Railway.

History 

It was situated on the west side of the A68 on what is now the Waskerley Way cycle track which passes through the station site. The goods traffic that was handled at the station was ganister (stone) and livestock. By 1931, passenger numbers had declined to 2,548 and to 753 in 1938, which led to its inevitable passenger closure on 1 May 1939. The station was still open to goods traffic with a single track in the 1950s until it closed completely on 6 June 1966. The line through the station continued to carry mineral traffic until 1 May 1969 and was then dismantled in 1970.

By the 1970s, the station buildings had fallen into disrepair however in 1972 the station buildings were dismantled for reassembly at the North of England Open Air Museum at Beamish. The relocated Rowley station was opened to public as a museum exhibit in 1976 and is presented as a North Eastern Railway station during the Edwardian period.

References

External links 

Disused railway stations in County Durham
Former North Eastern Railway (UK) stations
Railway stations in Great Britain opened in 1845
Railway stations in Great Britain closed in 1939
1845 establishments in England
1966 disestablishments in England